Jackie Akello is a Uganda singer-songwriter and entrepreneur with a coffee brand Village Belle which she launched in 2017. She sings in Acholi, Luganda, Swahili, and English. She is known for her hit love ballad "Amari", the gospel hit "Samanya" with Levixone, and the war-themed pop hit "Apwoyo". Akello is an Acholi  from northern Uganda and most of her songs like "Apwoyo" talk about the suffering of the Acholi both during and after the Lord's Resistance Army war that left Acholis out of their homes for a long time.

Career

Music
Jackie joined a number of live performing bands before going solo. She was a member of Janzi, The Sundowners and then her own Amari Band. She worked with Levixone on their hit gospel single "Samanya". She also worked with other musicians such as Kaweesa, Suzan Kerunen, Myko Ouma, Tshila and Kinobe Herbert.

She worked as a backup singer for Lilian Mbabazi on songs including "Vitamin". Jackie took on an acting role in Maurice Kirya's "Busaballa" video as Proscovia.

She has performed on live stages including World Music Day 2014 and 2017 in Kampala, Blankets and Wine festival, Bayimba festival, and many other private and public events. She also toured France.

Jackie worked on song titled "Black Yellow Red", an all-star project with Cindy, Irene Ntale, Michael Ross, Viboyo, Nick Nola, and many others. She also collaborated with Mun*G and T-Bro on the song "Ffena awamu." She also went international where she participated in the Singing wells projects/Abubilla Music based in the U.K in which she got to work with different artists from East Africa.

The singer entertained guests Forest Whitaker during his Ugandan visit to champion peace and development initiatives through young people.

Coffee business
In 2017, Jackie launched her own coffee brand Village Belle which she said she had had on her mind for a long time.

Confusion with look-alike
Akello has a striking resemblance to Kenyan and Oscar award winner Lupita Nyong'o. During shooting of the film Queen of Katwe, most people and journalists that met or saw a photo of Akello thought it was Nyong'o since everyone knew she was the country shooting the movie. The circus started when Akello's photo was published on Maurice Kirya's Facebook page to promote a music video for the song "Busabala" in which Jackie acted, which raised a lot of attention to the singer.

Discography

Albums
 Akello Music

Songs
 Amari
 Apwoyo
 Samanya
 Wan Wilobo
 Hallelujah

Nominations and awards

References

Ugandan women musicians
Ugandan singer-songwriters
21st-century Ugandan women singers
Soul musicians
Living people
Ugandan jazz musicians
Janzi Band members
1986 births